Central Wisconsin Christian High School is a private Christian school in Waupun, Wisconsin.
The school is a high school, middle school, and elementary in one building. A normal eight-hour day consists of Science, History, Choir or Band, Bible, a flex period, Spanish, Physical Education, English/Grammar, and Math. Central Wisconsin Christian, or CWC, has many extra-circular opportunities as well. These include the following: Soccer, Volleyball, Basketball, Track, Golf, Trap, Play, Forensics, Art club, Improv, and Solo Emsemble.

References

External links 
 

Private high schools in Wisconsin